Matt Taylor (born 18 February 1992) is a New Zealand first-class cricketer who plays for Wellington.

References

External links
 

1992 births
Living people
New Zealand cricketers
Wellington cricketers
Cricketers from Porirua